is a manga written by Chisako Sakuragi and illustrated by Yukine Honami. It is published in English by Digital Manga Publishing, and in German by Carlsen Manga.

Reception
Ariadne Roberts, writing for Mania Entertainment, was relieved that the bisexual best friend of the protagonist was a confidant, not a love-rival, and felt the length of the volume helped the author create realistic characters.  Holly Ellingwood, writing for Active Anime, found the story "lovely, subtle and beautifully romantic".

References

External links

Drama anime and manga
2005 manga
Yaoi anime and manga
Tokuma Shoten manga
Digital Manga Publishing titles